Platynota rostrana, the omnivorous platynota moth, is a species of moth of the family Tortricidae. It is found from the United States (where it has been recorded from Alabama, Arizona, California, Florida, Georgia, Indiana, Louisiana, Mississippi, New Jersey, North Carolina, Oklahoma, South Carolina, Tennessee, Texas and Virginia), south through Mexico and Central America to South America (including Venezuela and Brazil). Its native range also includes the West Indies. It has been recorded from Europe, where it may temporarily establish through accidental importation in tropical plants.

The wingspan is 13–17 mm.

The larvae feed on various plants, including Citrus species. On Citrus, they have been recorded damaging unripe fruits and leaves. First instar larvae scrape the leaves and fruits. They use plant debris, feces and silk strands to build cocoons from which they emerge to feed and in which they remain until pupation. Later, they feed through fruit skin or bore holes.

References

Moths described in 1863
Platynota (moth)